Hall Peninsula is a small ice-free peninsula on the southeast coast of Snow Island in the South Shetland Islands, Antarctica.  The feature is scissors shaped with its north and south arms extending 800 m including Cacho Island and 750 m including Ogygia Island respectively, with  Ivaylo Cove lying in between. The area was visited by early 19th century sealers.

The peninsula is named after Captain Basil Hall, RN (1788–1844), a name originally applied by James Weddell to Snow Island.

Location

Map
 L.L. Ivanov. Antarctica: Livingston Island and Greenwich, Robert, Snow and Smith Islands. Scale 1:120000 topographic map.  Troyan: Manfred Wörner Foundation, 2009.

Notes

References
 Hall Peninsula. SCAR Composite Antarctic Gazetteer

Peninsulas of the South Shetland Islands